The Extension of Island line to Western District (previously known as West Island line) is a three-station western extension of the Hong Kong MTR's Island line. Construction of the line began on 10 August 2009, and the two westernmost stations on line opened on 28 December 2014; the intermediary Sai Ying Pun station opened on 29 March 2015. The first train went into service that day at 6:00 a.m. Hong Kong time.

History

Initial proposals 
The MTR Corporation Limited (MTRC) submitted its first proposal for the West Island line in May 2002. This was similar to the final alignment, with stations at Sai Ying Pun, Belcher and Kennedy Town. In revisions in 2003 and 2004, the West Island line became its own line, which would interchange with the Island line at Sheung Wan or Sai Ying Pun.  On 28 May 2004, planning for the line was deferred.

Final scheme

On 25 February 2005, the Panel of Transport of Legislative Council had a meeting discussing the West and South Island lines. MTR submitted a revised scheme on 22 February. An introduction to the scheme was conducted in the meeting.

In the scheme, the West Island line included only the extension to Island line. The rest became the west section of South Island line. The Extension of Island line to Western District would run from Sheung Wan to Kennedy Town:
 Sheung Wan
 Sai Ying Pun
 HKU, interchange to the South Island Line (West)
 Kennedy Town

The scheme was gazetted in October 2007 and given final authorisation in March 2009. Construction of the 3-kilometre extension started on 10 August 2009, for completion in 2014. The cost of the extension is estimated to be HK$15.4 billion.

Project details

Construction cost
According to the summary report of the new lines, the construction cost of the Extension of Island Line to Western District would be HK$15.4 billion (as at Dec 2008). MTR asked for government funding of less than half of the total cost. The remaining cost and the operational cost would be covered by MTR.

Features

Some features are firstly introduced into these new stations to enhance services and facilities. The "lift-only" entrances are placed at HKU and Sai Ying Pun due to the depth of these station. Several high-speed lifts with doors on both sides allow to transport a high volume of passengers in and out of the stations. When fire in stations, these lifts can also be used for evacuation. Fire shutters of each lift will be lowered and air within lift will be pressurised to prevent smoke and fire.

The new multi-purpose ticket machines are installed at West Island Line concourse. Using touch screens, it combines the existing functions of ticket vending machine and add-value machine. It can also buy single journey ticket and City Saver by cash or Octopus card.

See also
 MTR
 Future projects of the MTR
 South Island line

References

Papers from Government and Legislature
  From Highways Department Hong Kong. Retrieved 27 February 2005.
  From Panel of Transport, Legislative Council. 21 February 2005. Retrieved 27 February 2005.
  From Panel of Transport, Legislative Council. 21 February 2005. Retrieved 27 February 2005.
  From Panel of Transport, Legislative Council. 25 February 2005. Retrieved 5 March 2005.

News reports
Yung, Chester and Chung, Danny. "Western on the MTR track. (1 July 2005). The Standard.

Press releases
. (30 June 2005). From MTR Corporation.
MTRCL to proceed with preparations for West Island Line. (30 June 2005). From Information Services Department, Government of Hong Kong.

External links

 Papers from Legislative Council concerning West Island Line and South Island Line

Island line (MTR)

Central and Western District, Hong Kong
1432 mm gauge railways in Hong Kong
Railway lines opened in 2014